Elske McCain (born September 4, 1976) is an American film director, actress, producer and screenwriter.

Biography
Born in Yuma, Arizona, McCain began watching films at an early age and aspired to become an actress. In 2004 McCain was cast in 'Goat Sucker' by local film maker Matt Reel. On October 8, 2006, was an contestant of the Fox Reality Channel series The Search for the Next Elvira. She has since directed and produced her own films, including the films Creep Creepersins 'Vaginal Holocaust'. She directed her first film in 2009 entitled "Stripping For Dummies". The film features Independent actress Scarlet Salem.

Filmography

References

External links
 

1976 births
American film actresses
American women screenwriters
American screenwriters
American women film directors
Actresses from Arizona
Living people
American film directors
American film producers
American women film producers
21st-century American women